Hyblaea bohemani is a moth in the family Hyblaeidae described by Wallengren in 1856.

References

Hyblaeidae